George Burrington (ca. 1682 – 22 February 1759) was a British colonial official who served as the third and fifth governor of North Carolina from 1724 to 1725 and 1731 to 1734. He is noted for opening the lower Cape Fear region to settlement. From the outset of his administration, he encountered opposition to his authority.

Biography
Burrington was born in Devonshire, England. The register of Sampford Courtenay, recorded the baptism of a George Burrington on 14 November 1685. His parents were listed as John and Mary Burrington. John Burrington was the son of Gilbert Burrington. Notwithstanding his rough exterior, George Burrington seems to have been a man of education; and the sale of his books shows that he was not unprovided with literature at a time when libraries were few and scattered. His last will and testament is dated 8 December 1750. He was killed during an apparent robbery attempt in Westminster's St James's Park, 22 February 1759, and buried at St. John the Evangelist two days later.

Works
 An Answer to Dr. William Brakenridge's Letter Concerning the Number of Inhabitants, within the London Bills of Mortality. Wherein the Doctor's Letter is inserted at large, his Arguments proved inclusive, and the Number of Inhabitants increasing (1757)
 Seasonable Considerations on the Expediency of a War with France; Arising from a faithful Review of the State of both Kingdoms. To which are Added a Postscript, on the List of the French Army, a Short Comparison Between the British and French Dominions; and a State of the French Revenues, and Forces in the Year, 1701 (1743)

See also 
 List of unsolved murders in the United Kingdom

References

Further reading

External links

 

1682 births
1759 deaths
18th-century English writers
Burials in South East England
Governors of North-Carolina (1712–1776)
People from Devon
People murdered in Westminster
Unsolved murders in England